The Sablatnig C.III was a monoplane C-type reconnaissance two-seater aircraft developed and built by Sablatnig in Berlin, Germany, in 1918.

Design
It was a two-bay monoplane of conventional design, with staggered wings, two open cockpits in tandem, and fixed, tailskid undercarriage. The C.III was of wooden construction with a plywood-covered fuselage and fabric coverings. Like the Sablatnig C.II, the C.III used a Maybach Mb.IVa engine.

References

Bibliography

1910s German military reconnaissance aircraft
Sablatnig aircraft
Single-engined tractor aircraft
Monoplanes
Aircraft first flown in 1918